The Monaco Marathon or the Monaco and the Riviera Marathon (French: Marathon de Monaco et des Riviera) is a marathon run every year starting and finishing in Monaco. It crosses the border to France and Italy and goes along the coast to a turning point in Ventimiglia, Italy and back again to Monaco. There is also a 10 km race run entirely inside Monaco.

The marathon is run in March every year. In 2009 there were around 700 marathon participants, plus around 1000 participants in the 10 km race.

Due to the race's coincidence with French regional elections in 2010, the event was shortened to a half marathon, and Dennis Mehlfeld of Germany and American runner Heidi Freitag won the men's and women's races, respectively. The 10 km race continued as originally planned and a total of 1800 runners from 39 countries took part in the day's events that year.

From 2011 the race has been rebranded the Monaco Run with a course distance of 23.8km, slightly longer than a Half marathon.

Past winners
Key: 

From 2010, the official race distance is 23,8 km.

References

External links
marathoninfo

Cross-border races
Recurring sporting events established in 1997
Athletics in Monaco
Marathons in France
Marathons in Italy
Spring (season) events in Monaco